2001–02 Hong Kong FA Cup was the 27th staging of the Hong Kong FA Cup. 

It was competed by all of the 7 teams from Hong Kong First Division League and Fukien from the Second Division. The competition kicked off on 4 April 2002 and finished on 14 April with the final.

South China won the cup for the eighth time after beating Sun Hei by 1-0 in the final.

Fixtures and results 
source:

Bracket

References

Hong Kong FA Cup
Hong Kong Fa Cup
FA Cup